This is a list of Mexican football transfers for the 2017 summer transfer window, grouped by club. It only includes football transfers related to clubs from the Liga Bancomer MX, the top flight of Mexican football.

Liga MX

América

In:

Out:

Atlas

In:

Out:

BUAP

In:

Out:

Cruz Azul

In:

Out:

Guadalajara

In:

Out:

León

In:

Out:

Monterrey

In:

Out:

Morelia

In:

Out:

Necaxa

In:

Out:

Pachuca

In:

Out:

Puebla

In:

Out:

Querétaro

In:

Out:

Santos Laguna

In:

Out:

Tijuana

In:

Out:

Toluca

In:

Out:

UANL

In:

Out:

UNAM

In:

Out:

Veracruz

In:

Out:

Notes
Denotes end of a player's contract, however remaining attached to a club if transferring within the Mexico football league system due to the pacto de caballeros (gentlemen's pact) policy that Mexican league owners follow.

References

Summer 2017
Mexico
Tran
Tran